Where Do You Think You're Going may refer to:

"Where Do You Think You're Going", a song by Johnny Mathis from the 1959 album Faithfully
"Where Do You Think You're Going?", song by Dire Straits from 1979 album Communiqué
"Where Do You Think You're Going", song by Shania Twain from the deluxe edition of the 2017 album Now